Earth's mantle is a layer of silicate rock between the crust and the outer core. It has a mass of 4.01 × 1024 kg and thus makes up 67% of the mass of Earth. It has a thickness of  making up about 84% of Earth's volume. It is predominantly solid but, on geologic time scales, it behaves as a viscous fluid, sometimes described as having the consistency of caramel. Partial melting of the mantle at mid-ocean ridges produces oceanic crust, and partial melting of the mantle at subduction zones produces continental crust.

Structure

Rheology
Earth's mantle is divided into two major rheological layers: the rigid lithosphere comprising the uppermost mantle, and the more ductile asthenosphere, separated by the lithosphere-asthenosphere boundary. Lithosphere underlying ocean crust has a thickness of around 100 km, whereas lithosphere underlying continental crust generally has a thickness of 150–200 km. The lithosphere and overlying crust make up tectonic plates, which move over the asthenosphere.

The Earth's mantle is divided into three major layers defined by sudden changes in seismic velocity:

 the upper mantle (starting at the Moho, or base of the crust around  downward to )
 the transition zone (approximately ), in which wadsleyite (≈ ) and ringwoodite (≈ ) are stable
 the lower mantle (approximately ), in which bridgmanite (≈ ) and post-perovskite (≈ ) are stable

The lower ~200 km of the lower mantle constitutes the D" (D-double-prime) layer, a region with anomalous seismic properties. This region also contains large low-shear-velocity provinces and ultra low velocity zones.

Mineralogical structure 
 
The top of the mantle is defined by a sudden increase in seismic velocity, which was first noted by Andrija Mohorovičić in 1909; this boundary is now referred to as the Mohorovičić discontinuity or "Moho".

The upper mantle is dominantly peridotite, composed primarily of variable proportions of the minerals olivine, clinopyroxene, orthopyroxene, and an aluminous phase. The aluminous phase is plagioclase in the uppermost mantle, then spinel, and then garnet below ~100 km. Gradually through the upper mantle, pyroxenes become less stable and transform into majoritic garnet.

At the top of the transition zone, olivine undergoes isochemical phase transitions to wadsleyite and ringwoodite. Unlike nominally anhydrous olivine, these high-pressure olivine polymorphs have a large capacity to store water in their crystal structure. This has led to the hypothesis that the transition zone may host a large quantity of water. At the base of the transition zone, ringwoodite decomposes into bridgmanite (formerly called magnesium silicate perovskite), and ferropericlase. Garnet also becomes unstable at or slightly below the base of the transition zone.

The lower mantle is composed primarily of bridgmanite and ferropericlase, with minor amounts of calcium perovskite, calcium-ferrite structured oxide, and stishovite. In the lowermost ~200 km of the mantle, bridgmanite isochemically transforms into post-perovskite.

Composition 

The chemical composition of the mantle is difficult to determine with a high degree of certainty because it is largely inaccessible. Rare exposures of mantle rocks occur in ophiolites, where sections of oceanic lithosphere have been obducted onto a continent. Mantle rocks are also sampled as xenoliths within basalts or kimberlites.

Most estimates of the mantle composition are based on rocks that sample only the uppermost mantle. There is debate as to whether the rest of the mantle, especially the lower mantle, has the same bulk composition. The mantle's composition has changed through the Earth's history due to the extraction of magma that solidified to form oceanic crust and continental crust.

It has also been proposed in a 2018 study that an exotic form of water known as ice VII can form from supercritical water in the mantle when diamonds containing pressurized water bubbles move upward, cooling the water to the conditions needed for ice VII to form.

Temperature and pressure 
The temperature of the mantle increases rapidly in the thermal boundary layers at the top and bottom of the mantle, and increases gradually through the interior of the mantle. The enormous lithostatic pressure exerted on the mantle prevents melting, because the temperature at which melting begins (the solidus) increases with pressure.

Movement 

Because of the temperature difference between the Earth's surface and outer core and the ability of the crystalline rocks at high pressure and temperature to undergo slow, creeping, viscous-like deformation over millions of years, there is a convective material circulation in the mantle. Hot material upwells, while cooler (and heavier) material sinks downward. Downward motion of material occurs at convergent plate boundaries called subduction zones. Locations on the surface that lie over plumes are predicted to have high elevation (because of the buoyancy of the hotter, less-dense plume beneath) and to exhibit hot spot volcanism. The volcanism often attributed to deep mantle plumes is alternatively explained by passive extension of the crust, permitting magma to leak to the surface: the plate hypothesis.

The convection of the Earth's mantle is a chaotic process (in the sense of fluid dynamics), which is thought to be an integral part of the motion of plates. Plate motion should not be confused with continental drift which applies purely to the movement of the crustal components of the continents. The movements of the lithosphere and the underlying mantle are coupled since descending lithosphere is an essential component of convection in the mantle. The observed continental drift is a complicated relationship between the forces causing oceanic lithosphere to sink and the movements within Earth's mantle.

Although there is a tendency to larger viscosity at greater depth, this relation is far from linear and shows layers with dramatically decreased viscosity, in particular in the upper mantle and at the boundary with the core. D may consist of material from subducted slabs that descended and came to rest at the core–mantle boundary or from a new mineral polymorph discovered in perovskite called post-perovskite.

Earthquakes at shallow depths are a result of faulting; however, below about  the hot, high pressure conditions ought to inhibit further seismicity. The mantle is considered to be viscous and incapable of brittle faulting. A number of mechanisms have been proposed to explain this phenomenon, including dehydration, thermal runaway, and phase change.

The pressure at the bottom of the mantle is ~136 GPa (1.4 million atm). Pressure increases as depth increases, since the material beneath has to support the weight of all the material above it. The entire mantle, however, is thought to deform like a fluid on long timescales, with permanent plastic deformation accommodated by the movement of point, line, and/or planar defects through the solid crystals composing the mantle. Estimates for the viscosity of the upper mantle range between 1019 and 1024 Pa·s, depending on depth, temperature, composition, state of stress, and numerous other factors. Thus, the upper mantle can only flow very slowly. However, when large forces are applied to the uppermost mantle it can become weaker, and this effect is thought to be important in allowing the formation of tectonic plate boundaries.

Exploration 
Exploration of the mantle is generally conducted at the seabed rather than on land because of the relative thinness of the oceanic crust as compared to the significantly thicker continental crust.

The first attempt at mantle exploration, known as Project Mohole, was abandoned in 1966 after repeated failures and cost over-runs.

More successful was the Deep Sea Drilling Project (DSDP) that operated from 1968 to 1983. Coordinated by the Scripps Institution of Oceanography at the University of California, San Diego, DSDP provided crucial data to support the seafloor spreading hypothesis and helped to prove the theory of plate tectonics. Glomar Challenger conducted the drilling operations. DSDP was the first of three international scientific ocean drilling programs that have operated over more than 40 years. Scientific planning was conducted under the auspices of the Joint Oceanographic Institutions for Deep Earth Sampling (JOIDES), whose advisory group consisted of 250 distinguished scientists from academic institutions, government agencies, and private industry from all over the world. The Ocean Drilling Program (ODP) continued exploration from 1985 to 2003 when it was replaced by the Integrated Ocean Drilling Program (IODP).

On 5 March 2007, a team of scientists on board the RRS James Cook embarked on a voyage to an area of the Atlantic seafloor where the mantle lies exposed without any crust covering, midway between the Cape Verde Islands and the Caribbean Sea. The exposed site lies approximately three kilometres beneath the ocean surface and covers thousands of square kilometres.
A relatively difficult attempt to retrieve samples from the Earth's mantle was scheduled for later in 2007. This is nearly three times as deep as preceding oceanic drillings.

A novel method of exploring the uppermost few hundred kilometres of the Earth was proposed in 2005, consisting of a small, dense, heat-generating probe which melts its way down through the crust and mantle while its position and progress are tracked by acoustic signals generated in the rocks. The probe consists of an outer sphere of tungsten about one metre in diameter with a cobalt-60 interior acting as a radioactive heat source.

Exploration can also be aided through computer simulations of the evolution of the mantle. In 2009, a supercomputer application provided new insight into the distribution of mineral deposits, especially isotopes of iron, from when the mantle developed 4.5 billion years ago.

See also
 Internal structure of Earth

References

External links 

 The Biggest Dig: Japan builds a ship to drill to the earth's mantle – Scientific American (September 2005)
 Information on the Mohole Project
 The Vredefort astrobleme, mantle plumes, core pipes, and tectonic-plate drift (www.impacttectonics.org)

 
Structure of the Earth